Aleksandr Krasnov (born 7 April 1960) is a Soviet former cyclist. He won the gold medal in the Men's team pursuit at the 1980 Summer Olympics.

Major results
Sources:
1978
 UCI Junior Track World Championships
1st  Team pursuit (with Konstantin Khrabvzov, Valery Movchan, Sergey Nikitenko)
1981
 3rd Overall Olympia's Tour
1st Stage 2
1982
 UCI Track World Championships
1st  Team pursuit (with Nikolai Manakov, Viktor Manakov, Ivan Mitchenko)
 2nd Overall Olympia's Tour
1983
 2nd Overall Tour of Sweden
 3rd Overall Vuelta al Táchira
1st Stage 4 
1984
 2nd Overall Österreich-Rundfahrt
1st Stages 3 & 5
1986
 1st Overall Giro Ciclistico d'Italia
 2nd Baltic Sea Friendship Race
1987
 UCI Track World Championships
1st  Team pursuit (with Viatcheslav Ekimov, Viktor Manakov, Sergeï Chmelinine)
 1st Stage 2 Amateur Ronde van België 
1988
 1st Stage 5 Vuelta al Táchira
1989
 1st Imatran ajot

References

External links

1960 births
Living people
People from Lomonosovsky District, Leningrad Oblast
Cyclists at the 1980 Summer Olympics
Olympic cyclists of the Soviet Union
Olympic gold medalists for the Soviet Union
Soviet male cyclists
Olympic medalists in cycling
Medalists at the 1980 Summer Olympics
Universiade medalists in cycling
Russian track cyclists
Universiade gold medalists for the Soviet Union
Medalists at the 1983 Summer Universiade
Sportspeople from Leningrad Oblast